Parviz Natel Khanlari (March 20, 1914 – August 23, 1990) was an Iranian literary scholar, linguist, author, researcher, politician, and professor at Tehran University.

Biography 

Parviz Natel Khanlari graduated from Tehran University in 1943 with a doctorate degree in Persian literature, and began his academic career in the faculty of arts and letters. He also studied linguistics at Paris University for two years. From then on, Khanlari founded a new course named history of Persian language in Tehran University.

Apart from his academic career which continued until the 1979 revolution, Khanlari held numerous administrative positions in the Iran in the 1960s through the late 1970s.

Parviz Natel Khanlari was founder and editor of Sokhan magazine, a leading literary journal with wide circulation among Iraninan intellectuals and literary scholars from the early 1940s to 1978.

See also 

 Persian literature
 Iranian Studies

References

Bibliography

Further reading 

 Parviz Natel-Khanlari, editor, Divān-e Hāfez, Vol. 1, The Lyrics (Ghazals) (Tehran, Iran, 1362 AH/1983-4). This work has been translated by Peter Avery, The Collected Lyrics of Hafiz of Shiraz, 603 pp. (Archetype, Cambridge, UK, 2007). 
 ʿAbd-al-Ḥosayn Āḏarang and EIr, “KHANLARI, PARVIZ,” Encyclopædia Iranica, online edition, 2016

External links 

 Javād Es'hāghiān, Doctor Khanlari: A wave that did not rest (Doctor Khānlari: Mouji ke nayāsood), in Persian, Āti-Bān, 2008, . Note:  The subtitle of this article is a paraphrase of a couplet from a long Persian poem by Mohammad Iqbal (better known in Iran as Eqbāl-e Lāhourí).

Persian-language writers
Linguists from Iran
Iranian literary scholars
1914 births
1990 deaths
Iranian grammarians
Linguists of Persian
Grammarians of Persian
Academic staff of the University of Tehran
Rastakhiz Party politicians
People's Party (Iran) politicians
Iranian emigrants to France
University of Paris alumni
University of Tehran alumni

20th-century Iranian writers
20th-century linguists
Faculty of Letters and Humanities of the University of Tehran alumni
Iranian magazine founders
People from Nur, Iran